Francis Hyacinth (14 September 1632 – 4 October 1638) was Duke of Savoy from 1637 to 1638 under regency of his mother  Christine Marie.

Biography

Born at the Castle of Valentino in Turin he was the eldest surviving son of Victor Amadeus I, Duke of Savoy and his wife Christine Marie of France. As the heir to the Savoyard throne, he was styled as the Prince of Piedmont. His parents had another son who had died in 1628 prior to the birth of Francis Hyacinth.

At his father's death in October 1637, he succeeded and his mother took power having been claimed regent. While Duke of Savoy he also held the subsidiary titles of Marquess of Saluzzo, count of Aosta, Moriana and Nice, and claimant King of Jerusalem. The infant was nicknamed the Flower of Paradise (French: Fleur de Paradis). Having succeeded his father at such a young age, Francis Hyacinth did not rule de facto being only 5 years old. Having caught a fever, he died at the Castle of Valentino, and was succeeded by his brother Charles Emmanuel II. The infant was buried at the Sacra di San Michele in Turin.

Ancestry

References

|-

1632 births
1638 deaths
17th-century Dukes of Savoy
Nobility from Turin
Princes of Savoy
Princes of Piedmont
Claimant Kings of Jerusalem
Monarchs who died as children
Modern child monarchs
Burials at the Sacra di San Michele, Turin
Counts of Aosta